Liu Zixuan may refer to:

Liu Zhiji (661–721), courtesy name Zixuan, Tang dynasty literati and historian
Jesseca Liu (born 1979), Malaysian actress